Poland competed at the 2001 World Championships in Athletics in Edmonton, Canada, from 3 – 12 August 2001.

Medalists

Sources 

Nations at the 2001 World Championships in Athletics
World Championships in Athletics
Poland at the World Championships in Athletics